A norepinephrine reuptake inhibitor (NRI, NERI) or noradrenaline reuptake inhibitor or adrenergic reuptake inhibitor (ARI), is a type of drug that acts as a reuptake inhibitor for the neurotransmitters norepinephrine (noradrenaline) and epinephrine (adrenaline) by blocking the action of the norepinephrine transporter (NET). This in turn leads to increased extracellular concentrations of norepinephrine and epinephrine and therefore can increase adrenergic neurotransmission.

Medical use 
NRIs are commonly used in the treatment of conditions like ADHD and narcolepsy due to their psychostimulant effects and in obesity due to their appetite suppressant effects. They are also frequently used as antidepressants for the treatment of major depressive disorder, anxiety and panic disorder. Additionally, many addictive substances such as cocaine and methylphenidate possess NRI activity, though NRIs without combined dopamine reuptake inhibitor (DRI) properties are not significantly rewarding and hence are considered to have negligible potential for addiction. However, norepinephrine has been implicated as acting synergistically with dopamine when actions on the two neurotransmitters are combined (e.g., in the case of NDRIs) to produce rewarding effects in psychostimulant addictive substances.

Depression 
A meta analysis published in BMJ in 2011 concluded that the selective NRI reboxetine is indistinguishable from placebo in the treatment of depression. A second review by the European Medicines Agency concluded that reboxetine was significantly more effective than placebo, and that its risk/benefit ratio was positive.  The latter review, also examined the efficacy of reboxetine as a function of baseline depression, and concluded that it was effective in severe depression and panic disorder but did not show effects significantly superior to placebo in mild depression.

A closely related type of drug is a norepinephrine releasing agent (NRA).

List of selective NRIs 

Many NRIs exist, including the following:

 Selective norepinephrine reuptake inhibitors
 Marketed
 Atomoxetine (Strattera)
 Reboxetine (Edronax, Vestra)
 Viloxazine (Qelbree, Vivalan)
 Never marketed
 Amedalin (UK-3540-1)
 Daledalin (UK-3557-15)
 Edivoxetine (LY-2216684)
 Esreboxetine (AXS-14; PNU-165442G)
 Lortalamine (LM-1404)
 Nisoxetine (LY-94,939)
 Talopram (tasulopram) (Lu 3–010)
 Talsupram (Lu 5–005)
 Tandamine (AY-23,946)
 NRIs with activity at other sites
 Marketed
 Bupropion (Wellbutrin, Zyban)
 Desipramine (Norpramin)
 Maprotiline (Ludiomil)
 Nortriptyline (Pamelor)
 Protriptyline (Vivactil)
 Tapentadol (Nucynta)
 Teniloxazine (Lucelan, Metatone)
 Never marketed
 Ciclazindol (Wy-23,409)
 CP-39,332
 Manifaxine (GW-320,659)
 Radafaxine (GW-353,162)

Note: Only NRIs selective for the NET greater than the other two monoamine transporters (MATs) are listed here. For a list of NRIs that act at multiple MATs, see the other monoamine reuptake inhibitor pages such as NDRI, SNRI, and SNDRI.

See also
Monoamine reuptake inhibitor
Beta blocker, similar type of drugs used to block epinephrine and norepinephrine beta receptors
List of adrenergic drugs

References